Margaret McNair Stokes (March 1832 – 20 September 1900) was an Irish Illustrator, antiquarian and writer.

Life
Born in Dublin, she was the daughter of Dr William Stokes and his wife Mary (née Black). One brother, Whitley Stokes, was a leading Celticist, a second, Sir William, followed their father into medicine and was a leading surgeon. Important figures in the field of antiquities such as artist Sir George Petrie, lawyer and poet Sir Samuel Ferguson, Edwin Wyndham-Quin, 3rd Earl of Dunraven and Mount-Earl, and historians James Henthorn Todd and William Reeves were frequent visitors to the Stokes family home, and this is said to have begun Margaret's interest in Irish antiquities.

Her first published works were illustrations and illuminations for an 1861 edition of Ferguson's poem The Cromlech at Howth; the title page conflated parts of the illuminations on two pages of the Book of Kells. Margaret was an informed and experienced editor, photographer and illustrator by the time she came to publish research under her own name. In the 1870s she edited Dunraven's Notes on Irish Architecture (3 volumes, 1875–1877) after the author's death in 1871. Her Early Christian Art In Ireland (1887, 2nd edition 1911) was well regarded, and if reviewer Oscar Wilde was unmoved by Stokes' prose, he praised her illustrations. She produced two works on early medieval Irish saints in Europe, Six Months in the Apennines (1892) and Three Months in The Forest of France (1895). Her  High Crosses of Ireland was incomplete at her death.

She was the first Irish woman to be elected an honorary member of the Royal Irish Academy in 1876 and of the Royal Society of Antiquaries of Ireland.

Death
She died at her home in Howth, County Dublin in 1900. Her papers are possessed by Trinity College Dublin and the National Gallery of Ireland holds a chalk portrait by Walter Osborne.

References

Sources
 
 

1832 births
1900 deaths
Irish antiquarians
Irish art historians
Members of the Royal Irish Academy
Artists from Dublin (city)
Irish Protestants
People from Howth
Writers from Dublin (city)